Good News is the second album by Danish pop singer Bryan Rice. It was released in Denmark on 22 October 2007 by Border Breakers. The album entered the Danish Albums Chart at No. 36.

Track listing

Charts

Weekly charts

References

External links
 

2007 albums
Bryan Rice albums